Joe Fryer is the name of:

Joe Fryer (footballer), English footballer
Joe Fryer (journalist), American journalist